Shrikhandi Bhittha or Bhitthamore is an Indian village in the Mithila region of Bihar, situated near the Indo-Nepal border, on the banks of the perennial Ratnawati (Raato) river.

Geography 

It has a Border checkpoint at the crossing to Malibara, Jaleshwar, Nepal. It is about 30 kilometres away from its district headquarters Sitamarhi. National Highway 104 passes through Bhitthamore. Thus it is a gateway to Janakpur, Nepal and parts of Sitamarhi & Madhubani along the border side.

Festivals 
The major festival of this area is Chhath Puja in which people offer prayers to Lord Sun. Holi, Diwali, Dussehra, Makar Sankranti, Eid al-Fitr and Christmas are celebrated.

Education 
This is the educational hub of the area. There are many private as well as government-run schools.
Rajkiya Madhya Vidyalaya Shrikhandi Bhittha
Upgraded High School Bhittha Bazaar 
Middle School "Kanya"
High School Shrikhandi Bhittha, Bhitthamore 

Saraswati Shishu Mandir
Delhi Public School
Top Infant Public School
Muskan Public School 
Indian Public School

Economy 
It is a developing urban area with a primarily agricultural economy. over the past few years it has shown steady economic growth, this is mainly due to the international border, modernization, changing lifestyles and technical advancement in various fields.

Due to its growing economy, growing demand, improved connectivity & infrastructure, it has become a known centre for trade & commerce.

The village contains a market place named Bhitthamore.

Transportation 
Regular bus services are available to various locations in Bihar, with connections to other locations throughout the region.

The Sitamarhi-Bhitthamore Road is important for religious reasons as it connects Janakpur, which houses a 200-year-old Janki Temple with Sitamarhi—considered to be the birthplace of Goddess Sita.
 
National Highway 227 (Old NH-104) passes through Bhitthamore. Thus it is a gateway to Janakpur, Nepal and parts of Sitamarhi & Madhubani along the border side.This road keeps on making headlines of news due to the floods & international border sharing with Nepal.

Health 
Shrikhandi Bhittha Primary Health Center (Hindi: प्राथमिक स्वास्थ्य केन्द्र, श्रीखंडी भिट्ठा)

Landmark 

Maa Bhagwati sthal (Hindi: मां भगवती स्थल) 

Krishneshwar Nath Mahadev Mandir (कृष्णेस्वर नाथ महादेव मंदिर)

Mahavir sthan (Hindi: महावीर स्थान) 

Shalhesh sthan (Hindi: शलहेस स्थान)

Raato Bridge (Hindi: रातो पुल)

Pani Tanki (Hindi: पानी टंकी)

References

External links 
 https://reliefweb.int/report/pakistan/local-communities-take-ownership-flood-early-warning-system
https://www.google.com/search?kgmid=/g/1hc37trgm&hl=en-IN&q=Bhitthamore&kgs=7be240f3078b4d6b&shndl=0&source=sh/x/kp/osrp&entrypoint=sh/x/kp/osrp

Places in the Ramayana
Villages in Sitamarhi district
International border crossings
Cities and towns in Sitamarhi district